The Santiago Canyon Fire of 1889 (previously called the Great Fire of 1889) was a massive wildfire in California, which burned large parts of Orange County, Riverside County, and San Diego County during the last week of September 1889. The fire reportedly started in Fremont Canyon, a canyon close to what today is Irvine Lake. Until 2018, it was possibly the single largest wildfire in the recorded history of California, with at least  of land burned. In mid-August 2018, the Ranch Fire in the Mendocino Complex Fire surpassed the Santiago Canyon Fire's assumed acreage.

Assistant Regional Forester (USFS) L.A. Barrett, who wrote a 1935 report on California wildfires, said of it: "I was living in Orange County at the time and well remember the great fire reported herein from September 24 to 26. Nothing like it occurred in California since the National Forests have been administered. In fact in my 33 years in the Service I have never seen a forest or brush fire to equal it. This one covered an enormous scope of country and burned very rapidly."

This was coupled with multiple katabatic wind events (known as “northers” or Santa Anas) that month, one of which occurred about 10 days prior and likely added to the dryness of fuels. Temperatures during the week prior remained high and were coupled with several severe fires in San Diego County in which “at least  have burned over, a dwelling house consumed and other property destroyed”.

Overview
In addition to the Santiago Canyon Fire, there were several other significant fires fanned by the same gale force Santa Ana winds in San Diego and San Bernardino counties. The Orange County fire burned through areas of chaparral and coastal sage scrub, as well as a number of farm fields in the Santa Ana Valley, where farmers attempted to control the fire by plowing ahead of it. A detailed analysis of the fire can be found in an article by Keeley and Zedler.

Size
USFS Regional Forester L.A. Barrett (1935), in reference to the size stated that "Nothing like it occurred in California since the National Forests have been administered. In fact in my 33 years in the Service I have never seen a forest or brush fire to equal it." Other estimates have claimed a smaller size.

Reports
One of the first reports of the fire was delivered by telegraph. Riverside Daily Press and Tribune reported on the fire by telegraph as follows:

Daily San Diegan described the extent and damage wrought by the fire:

Daily Courier reported on the events of the Santiago Canyon Fire and other nearby wildfires in Southern California:

Many reports about the fire's size and impact were made that were supposedly false.

See also

 California Chaparral Institute
 List of California wildfires by size
 Mendocino Complex Fire, which surpassed the Santiago Canyon Fire as the largest in state history in 2018
 Santiago Fire, a 2007 fire that burned a similar path
 Silverado Fire, a 2020 fire that burned in the same area
 Bond Fire, a 2020 fire that burned a similar path

References

Citations

Bibliography

External links
 CalFire Fire Information
 Southern California's Worst Brush Fires

1889 fires in the United States
1889 in California
Santa Ana Mountains
Wildfires in Orange County, California
Wildfires in San Diego County, California
19th-century wildfires
1889 natural disasters in the United States